Walter Baseggio (born 19 August 1978) is a retired Belgian professional footballer who played as a central midfielder.

He spent most of his 15-year professional career with Anderlecht, amassing Belgian Pro League totals of 285 games and 48 goals and also representing in the competition Mouscron. He won major nine titles with his main club, including five national championships.

Club career
Born in Clabecq, Wallonia, Baseggio made an impressive debut for R.S.C. Anderlecht aged 17, against old rivals Standard Liège, and scored his first goal in the same game. At the time a hot prospect for the future, he was in direct competition with Enzo Scifo and Pär Zetterberg, two players whose talent was already confirmed; eventually he became a first-team regular, and then the maestro of the team after the departures of the pair in the late 1990s.

With the return of Zetterberg in the summer of 2003, Anderlecht coach Hugo Broos decided that there was no room for both players, and Baseggio found himself with few game opportunities, until the manager was fired in February 2005. After a disappointing end of season, he also played second-choice for new coach Franky Vercauteren; the owner of an extremely powerful shot, he scored the 1–1 equalizer in an eventual 2–1 win against R.A.A. Louviéroise in mid-November 2004, hitting the ball with such power that it burst.

In the 2005 summer Baseggio was transfer listed, joining Italy's Treviso F.B.C. 1993 in January 2006 and being relegated from Serie A in his first year. However, in the mid-season interval of the next season, he returned to Anderlecht: in his two stints with the Brussels club, he won four leagues, although he was only a fringe player in the last conquest.

After only three matches in the first part of the 2007–08 campaign, Baseggio moved again in January, joining R.E. Mouscron for an undisclosed fee, with a contract due to expire in June 2010. On 20 May of that year, the 31-year-old signed a three-year deal with A.F.C. Tubize in the second division, being a free agent since late in the previous year after the former side had folded due to serious financial problems. He played the remainder of his career in amateur football, representing Patro Lensois and ETSP Brainoise.

International career
Baseggio made his Belgium debut on 27 March 1999 (aged 20) in a 1–0 friendly loss in Bulgaria, going on to collect a further 26 caps. He did not take part, however, in any major international tournament, being injured for both the UEFA Euro 2000 and 2002 FIFA World Cup competitions.

Illness
Baseggio was diagnosed with thyroid cancer in June 2009. After being given the all-clear by doctors in 2010, he announced in May 2012 the cancer had returned.

Honours 
Anderlecht

 Belgian First Division: 1999–00, 2003–04, 2006–07
 Belgian Cup: runner-up 1996–97
 Belgian Supercup: 2000, 2001, 2007
 Belgian League Cup: 2000
 Belgian Sports Team of the Year: 2000

Individual
 Belgian Young Professional Footballer of the Year: 1998–99, 1999–2000
 Belgian Professional Footballer of the Year: 2000–01

References

External links

1978 births
Living people
Footballers from Walloon Brabant
Belgian people of Italian descent
Belgian footballers
Association football midfielders
Belgium international footballers
Belgian Pro League players
Challenger Pro League players
R.S.C. Anderlecht players
Royal Excel Mouscron players
A.F.C. Tubize players
Serie A players
Serie B players
Treviso F.B.C. 1993 players
Belgian expatriate footballers
Expatriate footballers in Italy
Belgian expatriate sportspeople in Italy
People from Tubize